Marçal may refer to:
 Guilhermina Marçal, a Roman Catholic Canossian sister
 Maria Mercè Marçal (1952–1998), a Spanish poet, professor, writer and translator
 Nuno Marçal (born 1975), a Portuguese basketball player
 Pedro Marçal (born 1938), a Portuguese fencer
 Marçal Justen Filho (born 1955), a Brazilian attorney and Law professor
 Fernando Marçal (born 1989), a Brazilian footballer